Roger Davidson may refer to:

Roger Davidson (footballer) (born 1948), English footballer
Roger Davidson (rugby union) (1869–1955), Scottish rugby union player